Kristoffer Per Thomas Broberg (born 1 August 1986) is a Swedish professional golfer who plays on the European Tour.

Professional career
Broberg started his professional career in 2010, winning twice on the Swedish mini tour. The following two years he won four events on the Nordic Golf League.

He qualified to play on the Challenge Tour in 2012. He won the second event he played in, the Finnish Challenge on 5 August. He won again the next week at the Norwegian Challenge. Broberg won for a third time that month at the Rolex Trophy to earn an instant promotion to the European Tour; he was the fastest player ever to achieve this having played just five events in the season. The victories helped Broberg shoot up the Official World Golf Ranking from 1,109th to 173rd, and he ended the year ranked 79th after finishing runner-up at the Alfred Dunhill Championship.

Broberg again came close to capturing his maiden European Tour victory in 2014 when he tied for third in the Irish Open and finished runner-up at the Scottish Open. He also recorded his third career runner-up finish at the Made in Denmark event during the 2015 season.

On 15 November 2015, Broberg won his maiden European Tour title at the BMW Masters, one of the four tournaments that make up the Race to Dubai Final Series. He won in a sudden-death playoff over American Patrick Reed, with a birdie on the first extra hole. This was the 100th win by a Swede in the history of the European Tour and earned Broberg an exemption through to 2017.

In September 2021, Broberg won the Dutch Open. He shot a final-round 72 after having an 8 shot lead after 54 holes, which included shooting a course record score of 64 in the second round and a new course record of 61 in the third round.

Professional wins (13)

European Tour wins (2)

European Tour playoff record (1–0)

Challenge Tour wins (4)

Challenge Tour playoff record (1–0)

Nordic Golf League wins (3)

Other wins (4)

Results in major championships

CUT = missed the half-way cut
"T" = tied

Results in World Golf Championships

Team appearances
Professional
EurAsia Cup (representing Europe): 2016 (winners)

See also
2012 Challenge Tour graduates
2017 European Tour Qualifying School graduates
List of golfers with most Challenge Tour wins
List of golfers to achieve a three-win promotion from the Challenge Tour

References

External links

Profile at golfdata.se 

Swedish male golfers
European Tour golfers
Golfers from Stockholm
1986 births
Living people
21st-century Swedish people